Stjepan Kljuić (born 19 December 1939) is a Bosnian Croat former politician who was the Croat Member of the Presidency of the Republic of Bosnia and Herzegovina before and during the Bosnian War. Kljuić was also the President of the Croatian Democratic Union.

Upon founding it, from 1992 until 1997, Kljuić was the first President of the Olympic Committee of Bosnia and Herzegovina as well.

Career
Kljuić was the Croat Member of the Presidency of Bosnia and Herzegovina and a founding member of the Croatian Democratic Union (HDZ BiH) party in 1990. He served as the president of the HDZ BiH and protested that Croats should support the elected government of Alija Izetbegović.

The central HDZ leadership in Zagreb pressured local leadership in Herzeg-Bosnia to depose him of his leadership position. He was replaced with Milenko Brkić.

Upon founding the Olympic Committee of Bosnia and Herzegovina in 1992, Kljuić was elected its first president. In 1994, he founded his own party, the Republican Party, a multi-ethnic, pro-Bosnia party. He stood as the party's candidate for the Croat member of the Presidency in the 2002 general election, but failed to be elected.

Later, Kljuić took part in the ICTY proceedings.

References

1939 births
Living people
Politicians from Sarajevo
Croats of Bosnia and Herzegovina
Croatian Democratic Union of Bosnia and Herzegovina politicians
Members of the Presidency of Bosnia and Herzegovina
Politicians of the Bosnian War